Louie may refer to:

Arts and entertainment
 Louie (American TV series), comedy drama television series created by and starring comedian Louis C.K.
 Louie (French TV series), animated series about a young rabbit who draws pictures which come to life
 "Louie" (song), by Blood Raw
 Louie (album), a 2022 album by Kenny Beats

People 
 Louie (given name)
 Louie (surname)

Fictional characters 
 Louie, one of Donald Duck's nephews
 Louie De Palma, dispatcher in the television series Taxi
 King Louie, in the 1967 Disney animated film The Jungle Book (1967 film)
 Big Louie, a gangster-mafia boss in the 1987-1996 animated television series Teenage Mutant Ninja Turtles
 Louie, in the soap opera EastEnders
 Louie, a character in the strategy video game series Pikmin
 Louie, a comic strip created and drawn by Harry Hanan
 Buzz Saw Louie, a character in the VeggieTales video, The Toy That Saved Christmas

Mascots 
 Louie the Bear, the St. Louis Blues mascot
 Louie the Laker, the Grand Valley State University mascot
 Louie the Lumberjack, the Northern Arizona University mascot

Other 
"Louie", a slang term for a Second lieutenant in the U.S. Army

See also
Loui (disambiguation)
Louis (disambiguation)
Luis (disambiguation)
Louise (disambiguation)
Louie Louie (disambiguation)